William Edward Worrall (born 1886) was an English professional footballer who played as a goalkeeper for Sunderland.

References

1886 births
People from Shildon
Footballers from County Durham
English footballers
Association football goalkeepers
South Bank F.C. players
Middlesbrough F.C. players
Shildon A.F.C. players
Sunderland A.F.C. players
Wingate Albion F.C. players
English Football League players
Year of death missing